Five Seven Music is the alternative/indie sub-label under The Eleven Seven Music Group.

Five Seven Music launched with Jet's Shaka Rock in 2009  followed by She Wants Revenge's Valleyheart in 2011. The label has rapidly grown since and has also released new albums from Dirty Heads, Shiny Toy Guns, Nico Vega and Midi Matilda, with more on the way and others to be announced.

Current artist roster
 Attica Riots 
 Bleeker
 Blondie
 Dark Waves
 Dirty Heads
 Just Loud
 NEVRLANDS
 Nico Vega
 ROMES
Lower Than Atlantis

See also
 List of record labels

References

American record labels